During the 2004–05 English football season, Gillingham F.C. competed in the Football League Championship.

Season summary
John Gorman was appointed to help Hessenthaler as the side started the 2004–05 season poorly, but as the team continued to struggle at the wrong end of the table Hessenthaler resigned as manager in late November. Somewhat unusually he continued to be employed as a player.   Gorman succeeded Hessenthaler in a caretaker capacity but left the club to take the manager's job at Wycombe Wanderers.  Gillingham then appointed former Burnley boss Stan Ternent as manager, but despite a late run of positive results, he couldn't prevent the Gills' relegation to League One on the last day of the season.  In a reversal of the previous season's fortunes, Crewe Alexandra, the team immediately above Gillingham in the table, survived by just one goal.

Final league table

Results
Gillingham's score comes first

Legend

Football League Championship

FA Cup

League Cup

Squad

Left club during season

References

Gillingham F.C. seasons
Gillingham F.C.